The Fast and the Furious: Original Motion Picture Soundtrack is the first of two soundtracks to Rob Cohen's 2001 action film The Fast and the Furious. It was released on June 5, 2001, via Murder Inc Records/Def Jam Recordings/Universal Music Group. Production was handled mostly by Irv Gotti, as well as twelve other record producers, including Channel 7, Damizza, Nick "Fury" Loftin and Swizz Beatz. It features contributions from the film star Ja Rule, along with Armageddon, Ashanti, Black Child, Boo & Gotti, Caddillac Tah, DMX, Faith Evans, Fat Joe, Funkmaster Flex, Limp Bizkit, Method Man, Nate Dogg, N.O.R.E., O-1, Petey Pablo, Redman, R. Kelly, Scarface, Shade Sheist, Tank and Vita. The album reached number seven on the Billboard 200, number five on the Top R&B/Hip-Hop Albums, and went platinum in 2002 in both the United States and Canada.

The lone single released from the soundtrack is "Put It On Me". Official music videos were done for "Put It On Me", "Furious" by Ja Rule, "POV City Anthem" by Cadillac Tah, "Good Life (Remix)" by Faith Evans and "Justify My Love" by Vita.

Track listing

Charts

Weekly charts

Year-end charts

Certifications

References

External links

2001 soundtrack albums
Hip hop soundtracks
Fast & Furious albums
Action film soundtracks
Adventure film soundtracks
Albums produced by R. Kelly
Albums produced by Irv Gotti
Albums produced by Swizz Beatz